Acanthocorbis is a genus of choanoflagellates within the family Acanthoecidae.

Species

References 

Choanoflagellatea
Taxa described in 1984